Souvanna Phomma was installed as oupahat, a royal title for the viceroy of a Buddhist dynasty, of Luang Phrabang in 1878. He authored a History of Louang Phrabang and had nineteen sons, including Bounkhong, thirty-one daughters, and 3 grandchildren Souphanouvong, Souvanna Phouma, and Phetsarath Ratanavongsa. Souvanna Phomma had at least thirteen wives: the first was a commoner, the second was the daughter of King Sukaseum, the third was a daughter of King Chantharat, the fourth was from an unknown royal lineage, and both the fifth and sixths were his half-sisters; the next seven wives were all commoners.

He was beheaded during the sacking of Luang Prabang, by Đèo Văn Trị, a Tai Dam (Black Tai) chieftain at Lai Chau, on June 8, 1887.

References

Year of birth missing
1887 deaths
Laotian writers
People executed by Laos by decapitation
Executed Laotian people